Club Deportivo Mendi is a Spanish football team based in Mendigorria in the autonomous community of Navarre. Founded in 2002, it plays in Tercera Division Group 15. Its stadium is Estadio El Pontarrón with a capacity of 1,500 seaters.

Season to season

2 seasons in Tercera División

External links
Official website  
navarrafutbolclic.com profile
Futbolme.com profile  

Football clubs in Navarre
Association football clubs established in 2002
Divisiones Regionales de Fútbol clubs
2002 establishments in Spain